{|

{{Infobox ship characteristics
|Hide header=
|Header caption=
|Ship class=
|Ship type=*Fishing trawler (1930–39)
Vorpostenboot (1939–44)
Cargo ship (1947–62)
|Ship tonnage=, 
|Ship displacement=
|Ship length=
|Ship beam=
|Ship height=
|Ship draught=
|Ship depth=
|Ship decks=
|Ship deck clearance=
|Ship ramps=
|Ship ice class=
|Ship sail plan=
|Ship power=Triple expansion steam engine, 73nhp
|Ship propulsion=Single screw propeller
|Ship speed=
|Ship capacity=
|Ship crew=
|Ship notes=
}}
|}

V 404 Baden was a German fishing trawler that was requisitoned by the Kriegsmarine during the Second World War for use as a vorpostenboot. She was built in 1930 as Jakob Goldschmidt and was renamed Baden in 1933. She served as V 214 Baden and V 404 Baden. Scuttled in 1944, she was raised post war and became the French cargo ship Docteur Edmond Papin. Sold to the United Kingdom in 1961, she was scrapped the next year.

Description
The engine was built by the Ottensener Maschinenbau GmbH, Altona, Germany. It was rated at 73nhp.

HistoryJakob Goldschmidt was built as yard number 286 by the Schiffswerft von Henry Koch, AG, Lübeck, Germany for the Hochseefischerei J. Wieting AG, Nordenham, Germany. She was launched in June 1930 and completed the next month. The fishing boat registration ON 145 was allocated, as were the Code Letters NKHS. She was operated under the management of the Nordsee Deutsche Hochseefischerei Bremen-Cuxhaven AG. In April 1933, she was renamed Baden. On 4 September 1930 her fishing boat registration was changed to PG 480 and on 10 November she was sold to her managers. During 1934, her Code Letters were changed to DNOV. She took part in Festungskriegsübung Swinemünde on 10 June 1937.

On 23 September 1939, Baden was requisitioned by the Kriegsmarine for use as a vorpostenboot. She was allocated to 2 Vorpostenflotille as V 214 Baden. On 21 October, she was transferred to 4 Vorpostenflotille as V 404 Baden. On 19 February 1943, she attacked and damaged the submarine , which had sunk V 408 Haltenbank in the Bay of Biscay off Bilbao, Spain. On 26 August 1944, she was scuttled at Bordeaux, Gironde, France.Baden was raised post-war, repaired and returned to service in 1947 as the French merchant ship Docteur Edmond Papin'' for the Sociètè Française de Cabotage, Bordeaux. The Code Letters FPUW were allocated. In 1961, she was sold to the United Kingdom. She was scrapped the next year.

References

Sources

1930 ships
Ships built in Lübeck
Fishing vessels of Germany
Steamships of Germany
Auxiliary ships of the Kriegsmarine
Maritime incidents in August 1944
Steamships of France
Merchant ships of France
Steamships of the United Kingdom
Fishing vessels of the United Kingdom